George Hay Shanks Burton Rodgers (19 December 1899 – 26 August 1982) was a Scottish footballer who played as a centre half, mainly for Chelsea – he made 122 appearances in major competitions for the West London club over seven seasons, helping them to gain promotion from the Football League Second Division in the 1929–30 season.

Born in Kinning Park (then an independent burgh just outside Glasgow), he spent part of his childhood in Cambuslang and began his football career to the north of the city with Kilsyth Rangers. After his time in England, Rodgers settled in the Scottish Highlands – as well as being player-coach of the local football club Clachnacuddin he opened a newsagent business in Merkinch (Inverness), and over several decades was heavily involved in the running of Clach, with several generations of his descendants also having strong ties to the Highland League side.

References

1899 births
1982 deaths
Scottish footballers
Scottish football managers
Footballers from Glasgow
Sportspeople from Cambuslang
Kilsyth Rangers F.C. players
Chelsea F.C. players
Clachnacuddin F.C. players
Association football central defenders
Highland Football League players
English Football League players
Scottish Junior Football Association players
Footballers from South Lanarkshire
Highland Football League managers